Latham-Baker House is a historic home located at Greensboro, Guilford County, North Carolina. It was built in 1913, and is a two-story, Prairie School style dwelling.  It has a low-pitched hip roof, broad, projecting eaves, and green terra cotta tile roof. An addition was constructed about 1916. Also on the property is a contributing carriage house, or three-car garage.

It was listed on the National Register of Historic Places in 1982.  It is located in the Fisher Park Historic District.

References

Houses on the National Register of Historic Places in North Carolina
Prairie School architecture in North Carolina
Houses completed in 1913
Houses in Greensboro, North Carolina
National Register of Historic Places in Guilford County, North Carolina
1913 establishments in North Carolina
Historic district contributing properties in North Carolina